Mohsen Abdullah (Arabic:محسن عبد الله) (born 13 April 1995) is an Emirati footballer who plays as a winger.

Career
Mohsen Abdullah started his career at Al Ain and is a product of the Al-Ain's youth system. On 28 April 2016, Mohsen Abdullah made his professional debut for Al-Ain against Al-Fujairah in the Pro League, replacing Khaled Abdulrahman. He renewed his contract with Al Ain on 1 July 2019.

External links

References

1995 births
Living people
Emirati footballers
Al Ain FC players
UAE Pro League players
Association football wingers
Place of birth missing (living people)